

Box office number-one films
This is a list of films which placed number one at the weekly box office in France during 2013. The weeks start on Wednesdays, and finish on Tuesdays. The box-office number one is established in terms of tickets sold during the week.

Highest-grossing French productions
This is a list of domestic films that registered over one million admissions in 2013.

Notes

References

See also
 List of French films of 2013
 Lists of highest-grossing films in France

France
2013 in French cinema
2013